Meduza (Russian: Медуза, named after the Greek goddess Medusa) is a Russian- and English-language independent news website, headquartered in Riga, Latvia. It was founded in 2014 by a group of former employees of the then-independent Lenta.ru news website. Free mobile applications for iOS, Windows Phone and Android became the basis of the media.

A semi-official motto of the portal is "Make the Kremlin sad".

History 
In 2014, Galina Timchenko was fired from her job as chief editor at Lenta.ru by oligarch Alexander Mamut, a supporter of Vladimir Putin, after she had interviewed Right Sector. She launched the new webpage Meduza in October 2014. Several former journalists of Lenta.ru joined the new online site.

Timchenko told Forbes that the decision to base Meduza in Latvia was made since "right now, establishing an independent Russian language publishing house in Latvia is possible, while in Russia it is not". Moreover, Timchenko stated: "We understood that in Russia, most likely, they would not let us work."

Russian businessman and former oligarch Mikhail Khodorkovsky and telecommunications magnate Boris Zimin had been considered as passive investors, but they parted ways "for strategic and operational reasons". For financial reasons, Timchenko and her partner at Amond & Smith Ltd, Sergey Nazarkin, based Meduza in Latvia.

In February 2015, the website also launched an English-language version. In January 2016, founder and CEO Galina Timchenko handed over the role of chief editor to her deputy Ivan Kolpakov.

In August 2017, Meduza started a partnership with the American news website BuzzFeed News. The partnership included publishing each other’s materials, sharing experiences, and carrying out and publishing joint investigations.

On October 20, 2018, at the outlet's annual celebration, Meduza chief editor and co-founder Ivan Kolpakov reportedly groped an employee's wife, saying, "You're the only one at this party I can harass and get away with it." Kolpakov was temporarily suspended until Meduza publicly censured and reinstated him. The incident triggered a social media backfire. On November 9 Kolpakov announced his resignation saying that "it is the only way to stop the crisis engulfing the website and minimize the damage to its reputation". He was reinstated as chief editor on March 11, 2019.

In 2019, Meduza started the English podcast The Naked Pravda, which highlights how Meduza's top reporting intersects with the wider research and expertise that exists about Russia.

Meduza published an editorial condemning the 2022 Russian invasion of Ukraine on 24 February 2022; due to its coverage of the invasion, the site was blocked on the territory of Russia by Roskomnadzor among other news websites due to the "systematic dissemination of fakes". Actions of the Russian authorities from 2021 caused financial difficulties for Meduza, as it stopped many advertisers from Russia, which were the portal's main source of income, from displying their ads at Medusa's pages. This resulted in an international campaign to collect funds to ensure Medusa's survival through donations and buying subscriptions. On March 11, Reporters Without Borders announced a mirror site has been set up.

Structure 
By 2014 Meduza had a team of around 20 journalists. No Latvian journalists contribute to the project.

Since March 2015, Meduza has published a daily news called “Evening Meduza”.

In September 2022, it announced the creation of English email dispatch 'The Beet', aiming to amplify "local perspectives" from Central/Eastern Europe, the Caucasus and Central Asia, "without centering Moscow".

Audience 
Three months after opening, Meduza had 1.3 million monthly readers of its Internet publication. In 2017, Meduza had 7.5 million readers per month and 2 million followers on social media.

Meduza grants open source access to all they coverage of the war in Ukraine under a Creative Commons license. The articles can be reprinted in full (CC BY 4.0, does not apply to photos).

Censorship
Meduza aims to fill a market niche that exists due to "a long list of forbidden topics which Russian media do not raise for various reasons—due to direct and indirect censorship".

The day after it was launched, Meduza was blocked in Kazakhstan, probably due to an article about the city of Oskemen (Ust-Kamenogorsk).

Access to the site has also been blocked in Uzbekistan.

Meduza has installed technical measures to circumvent censorship with their mobile apps.

In June 2019, Meduza journalist Ivan Golunov was arrested by Russian police for claimed drug offences. Colleagues and friends of Golunov said they believed the charges to be fabricated, motivated by his investigations into corruption. Following a public outcry, Golunov was released, and five police officers were fired and later arrested.

On 23 April 2021, the Russian Ministry of Justice designated Meduza as a "foreign agent". In response, the European Union rejected the decision, saying this restriction "goes against Russia's international obligations and human rights commitments".

Meduza condemned the 2022 Russian invasion of Ukraine; as a reaction, the site has been blocked on the territory of Russia by Roskomnadzor. Russian journalist Ilya Krasilshchik, the former publisher of Meduza, was charged under the "fake news" law for denouncing the war in Ukraine.

On 26 January 2023, the Russian prosecutor-general’s office declared Meduza as an undesirable organization in Russia.

See also
 Novaya Gazeta
 Segodnya

References

External links
 
   
 https://meduza.io/en/   
 https://meduza.global.ssl.fastly.net/en Fastly Mirror site 
 
 
 Meduza on Medium

2014 establishments in Latvia
Internet properties established in 2014
Mass media in Riga
Multilingual websites
Russian news websites
Russian-language mass media in Latvia
Bilingual newspapers
Media listed in Russia as foreign agents
Undesirable organizations in Russia
Meduza
Russian-language websites